TCIM is a protein that in humans is encoded by the TCIM gene.

Function 

This gene encodes a small, monomeric, predominantly unstructured protein (106 amino acids, 12.3 kDa, isoelectric point 9.39). It is a positive regulator of the Wnt / beta-catenin signaling pathway. This protein interacts with a repressor of beta-catenin mediated transcription at nuclear speckles. It is thought to competitively block interactions of the repressor with beta-catenin, resulting in up-regulation of beta-catenin target genes.

References

Further reading

External links